Es'hailSat is a Qatar-based communications satellite operator. The company provides direct-to-home television with its satellite, and hopes to provide further television-related services in the future. The company launched the first-ever Qatar satellite – Es'hail 1 – in a collaboration with European satellite operator Eutelsat; Es'hailSat owned a majority stake in the satellite and launch.

Fleet

Es'hail 1

Es'hail 1, the first operational satellite in Es'hailSat's fleet, provides services for companies including BeIN Sports and Al Jazeera, who utilized the satellite's bandwidth for broadcasting HD TV. The satellite launched aboard Arianespace's Ariane 5 rocket in late 2014 and serves at the 25.5 degree East longitude.

Es'hail 2

Besides Es'hail 1, the company has a second satellite, Es'hail 2, which launched aboard a SpaceX Falcon 9 rocket on November 15, 2018. Es'hail 2 was built by Japan's Mitsubishi Electric company, and operates at 26° East longitude along a geostationary orbit to provide direct-to-home television services in the Middle East and North Africa region.

References 

Communications satellite operators
Telecommunications companies of Qatar
Space program of Qatar
Companies based in Doha